Interstate 95 (I-95) is a major Interstate Highway, running along the East Coast of the United States from Florida to Maine. The route runs through the cities of Florence and Walterboro.

Route description

For the most part, the  drive is fairly benign, passing through the pine forests, farmlands, and blackwater streams and swamps of the Atlantic Plain. As the route travels north, it moves inland from coastal cities such as Hardeeville and inland to cities such as Darlington. However, a few landmarks do exist to break up the monotony. Crossing from the south from Georgia just over the Savannah River bridge, motorists are greeted to an elaborate gateway of sabal palmettos into the state of South Carolina. The Juanita M. White Crosswalk also exists between exits 18 and 21. A flyover on twin high-spans over Lake Marion provides an unexpected scenic break in the center of the highway's length. The old US Highway 15 (US 15)/US 301 bridge runs along the west side of I-95 and is used for recreational purposes. Moving further north and out of the Palmetto State, the North Carolina state line is prominently marked by the South of the Border amusement complex at the US 301/US 501 exit. Local traffic parallel to the Interstate uses a combination of US 17 and US 17 Alternate (US 17 Alt.) from the Georgia state line north of Savannah to Walterboro, US 15 from Walterboro to Santee, and US 301 from Santee to South of the Border. In addition, I-95 shares a number of concurrencies, or multiplexes, with three of these US Highways at various stretches in South Carolina.

Services

The South Carolina Department of Transportation (SCDOT) operates and maintains three welcome centers and five rest areas along I-95. Welcome centers, which have a travel information facility on site, are located at milemarkers 4 (northbound), 99 (southbound), and 195 (southbound); rest areas are located at milemarkers 47 (north and southbound), 99 (northbound), and 139 (north and southbound).  Common at all locations are public restrooms, public telephones, vending machines, picnic areas, and barbecue grills.

The South Carolina Department of Public Safety (SCDPS) and South Carolina State Transport Police (STP) operate and maintain one truck inspection/weigh station, located northbound at milemarker 74. The location utilizes weigh-in-motion that does not require commercial motor vehicles to leave the freeway to be weighed. An inspection shed and pit are also on site, where full-service inspections are performed for flagged and randomly picked trucks.

Several parking area locations are also found along I-95; these were either formally rest areas or weigh stations that were converted. The parking areas offer no amenities and some are even restricted for commercial motor vehicles only.

Dedicated and memorial names
I-95 in South Carolina feature numerous dedicated or memorialized bridges, interchanges, and stretches of freeway.

 Blue Star Memorial Highway – Official South Carolina honorary name of I-95 throughout the state. Markers are located at both welcome centers.
 Jacob Ham, Jr. Highway – Is a dedicated  portion of I-95 located in Darlington County, north of Florence. Dedicated in October, 2013, it is in honor of Lance Corporal Jacob Ham Jr., who served as a trooper with the South Carolina Highway Patrol for 12 years until his death in 1998.
 Mark H. Coates Highway – Is a dedicated  portion of I-95 located in Jasper County near Hardeeville and extends  on both sides of milemarker 7. In May 1997, the South Carolina General Assembly passed a resolution to designate this section of I-95 in honor of Lance Corporal Mark Hunter Coates, who served as a trooper with the South Carolina Highway Patrol from 1987 until his death in 1992. Coates, who was a native of Lexington County, was fatally shot near milemarker 7 on November 20, 1992, during a traffic stop.

History

I-95 first appeared on state maps between 1962 and 1964, with construction from US 17 north of Hardeeville to Ridgeland. By 1967, more sections were under construction, including Pocotaligo to Walterboro and Santee to the North Carolina state line. The first section to officially open happened in 1968, from South Carolina Highway 527 (SC 527), near Gable, to SC 9/SC 57, in Dillon.

In 1971–1972, more sections of I-95 was completed: going north from SC 9/SC 57, in Dillon, to the North Carolina state line and going south from SC 527, near Gable, along the recently completed 1968-built Lake Marion bridge, to the US 301 connector, in Santee (exit 97). Also part of US 17 between Ridgeland  (exit 22) to near Yemassee (exit 33) was combined with I-95, with temporary status through Coosawhatchie; I-95 then continued on new freeway north to SC 63, in Walterboro.

By 1975, I-95 was open continuously from US 17, in Hardeeville, to SC 63, in Walterboro; temporary exits were removed around Coosawhatchie. In 1976, the two sections of I-95 were connected, from SC 63, in Walterboro, to the US 301 connector, in Santee (exit 97). In the same year, exit numbers were added along I-95. The last section of I-95 was completed in 1978, connecting US 17, in Hardeeville, south to the Georgia state line.

In 1987, US 15 and US 301 were relocated from a parallel bridge across Lake Marion, into a triple concurrency with I-95 between exits 97 and 102.

In 1990, exit 21 was added, for what was then US 278, but replaced by SC 336 in 1997. Between 1998 and 2000, exit 153, Honda Way, was added. In 2003, I-95 was widened to six lanes from just south of I-20 to north of SC 327, around Florence. 

In the 2010s, local leaders in Hardeeville had requested for a new exit, at milemarker 3, for the RiverPort Business Park, while, in Walterboro, an effort was being made to establish an I-95 business loop that would help steer travelers into the downtown area from the bypassing freeway. Neither efforts had made further traction since their initial announcements. Also, discussions of possibly converting I-95 into a toll road were brought up but was met with resistance, especially within SCDOT.

Exit list

See also

Edisto River
Lake Marion
Pee Dee River
South of the Border
South Carolina Highway Patrol

References

External links

Interstate 95 South Carolina (SouthEastRoads.com/AARoads.com)
South Caroline General Assembly 1993-1994 (Bill #1355)
motorways-exits.com (I-95)

 South Carolina
95
Transportation in Jasper County, South Carolina
Transportation in Hampton County, South Carolina
Transportation in Colleton County, South Carolina
Transportation in Dorchester County, South Carolina
Transportation in Orangeburg County, South Carolina
Transportation in Clarendon County, South Carolina
Transportation in Sumter County, South Carolina
Transportation in Florence County, South Carolina
Transportation in Darlington County, South Carolina
Transportation in Marlboro County, South Carolina
Transportation in Dillon County, South Carolina